Thiepval is a commune in the Somme department in Hauts-de-France in northern France.

Population

First World War 

The original village was totally destroyed during the First World War. The present Thiepval occupies a location a short distance to the southwest of the former settlement. The Thiepval Memorial to the Missing of the Somme, a major war memorial to British and Commonwealth men who died in the First World War Battle of the Somme and who have no known grave, is located near the commune.

Memorials 

It is visible for several kilometres in every direction. It is the work of the architect Sir Edwin Lutyens. The sixteen pillars are engraved with the names of 73,367 British and Commonwealth soldiers who fell during the Battle of the Somme between July and November 1916 and who have no known grave.

See also
 Battle of Thiepval Ridge (1916)
 Ulster Tower Thiepval
 Schwaben Redoubt

References

External links

 Prysor, Glyn: Thiepval Memorial , in: 1914-1918-online. International Encyclopedia of the First World War.

Communes of Somme (department)